Acetohexamide (trade name Dymelor) is a first-generation sulfonylurea medication used to treat diabetes mellitus type 2, particularly in people whose diabetes cannot be controlled by diet alone.

Mechanism of action

Acetohexamide bind to an ATP-sensitive K+ (KATP) channel on the cell membrane of pancreatic beta cells. This inhibits the out flux of potassium, which causes the membrane potential to become more positive. This depolarization in turn opens voltage-gated calcium channels. The rise in intracellular calcium leads to increased fusion of insulin granulae with the cell membrane, and therefore increased secretion of insulin.

Risks
Oral hypoglycemic drugs, including acetohexamide, have been associated with increased cardiovascular mortality. Talk to your doctor about the possible risks, benefits, and alternatives of using this drug for your condition.

References

Potassium channel blockers
1-(Benzenesulfonyl)-3-cyclohexylureas
Aromatic ketones